The Sri Lanka Basketball Federation is the governing body of basketball in Sri Lanka. It is associated with FIBA and FIBA Asia, as well as the National Olympic Committee of Sri Lanka.

References

Basketball in Sri Lanka
Basketball governing bodies in Asia
Sports governing bodies in Sri Lanka
Sports organizations established in 1958